The Junior Kiwis side represents New Zealand in the sport of rugby league. They are commonly known as the Junior Kiwis, after the native bird of that name.

Since 2010, they are an under-20s side, with players selected from the NRL, Intrust Super Cup, Intrust Super Premiership, Jersey Flegg Cup and Hastings Deering Colts. They are administered by the New Zealand Rugby League.

History
Prior to 2010, the Junior Kiwis consisted of the best New Zealand players aged 18 years or younger and would represent the country against the likes of the Australian Schoolboys, the New South Wales Under 18 side and the England Under 18 side, sometimes as curtain raisers to the senior Kiwi games. Players such as Adam Blair, Thomas Leuluai, Issac Luke, Simon Mannering, Jerome Ropati, Manu Vatuvei and Sonny Bill Williams represented the Junior Kiwis early in their careers and went on to play at the senior level for New Zealand.

In 2010, with the advent of the National Youth Competition, the Junior Kiwis was switched to an under 20s team and played in a two Test series against the Junior Kangaroos. From 2011 to 2018, the Junior Kiwis faced the Junior Kangaroos at the end of each season in a one-off Test match, usually as a curtain raiser to a senior level Australia-New Zealand Test match. In 2019, the side faced the Australian Schooolboys. The side reverted to an under-19 side for the fixture.

2010 series

1st Test
Played as a curtain raiser to the New Zealand-England Four Nations match.

2nd Test
Played as a curtain raiser to the New Zealand-Papua New Guinea Four Nations match.

2011 match
Played as a curtain raiser to the Australia-New Zealand pre-Four Nations tournament match.
Both coaches agreed to allow an 18th man be used during the match.

2012 match
Played as a curtain raiser to the Australia-New Zealand end of year Test match.

2013 match

2014 match

2015 match
Played as a curtain raiser to the Papua New Guinea-Fiji Melanesian Cup match and the Samoa-Tonga Polynesian Cup match.

2016 match
Played as a curtain raiser to the Papua New Guinea-Fiji Melanesian Cup match and the Samoa-Tonga Polynesian Cup match.

2017 match
Played as a curtain raiser to the 2017 Anzac Test.

2018 match
Played as a curtain raiser to the Australia-New Zealand end of year Test match.

2019 match
Played as a curtain raiser to the 2019 Queensland Cup Grand Final.

Players

Captains
Martin Taupau (2010)
Carlos Tuimavave (2011–2012)
Jason Taumalolo (2012)
David Bhana (2013)
Manaia Cherrington(2014)
Zach Dockar-Clay (2015)
Mafoa'aeata Hingano (2016)
Jarome Luai (2017)
Isaiah Papali'i (2018)
Jordan Riki (2019)

Coaches
David Kidwell (2010–2011)
John Ackland (2012)
Brent Gemmell (2013–2014)
Kelvin Wright (2015–2016)
Nathan Cayless (2017)
Ezra Howe (2018–)

See also
 New Zealand national rugby league team
 New Zealand Māori rugby league team

References

External links
Junior Kiwis Annual Results